Wierd Records is an American independent record label, founded in New York City by Pieter Schoolwerth in 2006.

"Wierd" was also the name for an associated weekly DJ night, now defunct, that started at Southside Lounge in Brooklyn in 2003, later held at Home Sweet Home in Manhattan. Schoolwerth has also performed with power electronics outfit Bloodyminded since the mid-'90s and was previously a member of Crash Worship.

Associated groups include Røsenkøpf, Martial Canterel, Led Er Est, Xeno & Oaklander, Blacklist, Frank (just Frank), Plastic Flowers, and Opus Finis.

The groups are also linked to developments in the visual arts; Schoolwerth is a noted conceptualist painter. Liz Wendelbo, a member of Xeno & Oaklander, is also a filmmaker, positing "cold cinema" as filmmaking that "predicates resistance to cinema as a virtual medium".

Style
The label takes inspiration from European permutations of post-punk, minimal synth, and dream pop, and from synthesizer-based groups described as "minimal electronics" (similar to electropunk or minimal electronica). The label is especially associated with a revival of the French cold wave style. The label positions itself as eccentric, marginal, and somewhat psychedelic, and in opposition to the mainstream goth subculture. Schoolwerth declares, "We don’t use the term goth. It has a derogatory connotation. It’s degenerated into some kind of ironic B-horror film thing. It’s lost its elegance, sophistication, and most importantly, its pretentiousness."

References

External links
"Hey Spooky Guy, Give Us Some Halloween Tunes" Pieter Schoolwerth's playlist for Vice
Review of Wierd Compilation Volume II, by Kristen Sollee of The Big Takeover
Review of Wierd Compilation Volume II, by Doug Mosurock of Dusted Magazine
The Fader Freak Scene #46, by Jamie Johns, November 2, 2009

American independent record labels
Record labels established in 2006